Hans Tegeback (born 30 May 1950) is a Swedish former backstroke swimmer. He competed in two events at the 1968 Summer Olympics.

References

External links
 

1950 births
Living people
Olympic swimmers of Sweden
Swimmers at the 1968 Summer Olympics
Swimmers from Stockholm
Swedish male backstroke swimmers